is a passenger railway station in the city of Tatebayashi, Gunma, Japan, operated by the private railway operator Tōbu Railway.

Lines

Station layout
The station consists of two opposed side platforms, connected to the station building by a footbridge.

Platforms

Adjacent stations

History
It was renamed Tatara Station on 1 March 1937.

From 17 March 2012, station numbering was introduced on all Tōbu lines, with Tatara Station becoming "TI-11".

Passenger statistics
In fiscal 2019, the station was used by an average of 650 passengers daily (boarding passengers only).

Surrounding area
Tatebayashi Tarata Post Office

See also
 List of Railway Stations in Japan

References

External links

  Tobu station information 
	

Tobu Isesaki Line
Stations of Tobu Railway
Railway stations in Gunma Prefecture
Railway stations in Japan opened in 1907
Tatebayashi, Gunma